Henri Cuq (12 March 1942 – 11 June 2010) was a member of the National Assembly of France.  He represented the Yvelines department,  and was a member of the Union for a Popular Movement.

References

1942 births
2010 deaths
Politicians from Toulouse
Rally for the Republic politicians
Union for a Popular Movement politicians
Government ministers of France
Deputies of the 12th National Assembly of the French Fifth Republic
Deputies of the 13th National Assembly of the French Fifth Republic
Deaths from cancer in France